Into A Raging Blaze  is a political thriller by Swedish author Andreas Norman, and is the first book of a proposed trilogy. The novel was translated into English by Ian Giles and published in 2014 by Quercus. It was nominated for the CWA International Dagger in 2015.
The title refers to Ibn Arabi's poem 18 from The Translation of Desires.

2014 Swedish novels
Novels by Andreas Norman
Swedish thriller novels
Swedish crime novels